Okechukwu Henry Offia (born 26 December 1999) is a Nigerian footballer who plays as a winger or forward for Trelleborgs FF.

Career

Club career
Offia caught the eye of IK Sirius of Sweden in an exhibition match in Lagos and joined the club in January 2018 and was immediately loaned out to Sollentuna FK. On 23 March 2020, Offia joined Dalkurd FF.

In February 2021, Offia joined Trelleborgs FF on a deal until the end of 2023.

References

External links

Nigerian footballers
1999 births
Living people
Allsvenskan players
Ettan Fotboll players
IK Sirius Fotboll players
Sollentuna FK players
Dalkurd FF players
Trelleborgs FF players
Association football midfielders
Nigeria under-20 international footballers
Nigeria youth international footballers
Nigerian expatriate footballers
Expatriate footballers in Sweden